On 13 March 2016, three Islamist gunmen opened fire at a beach resort in Grand-Bassam, Ivory Coast, killing at least 19 people and injuring 33 others.

Attack 
Three armed assailants attacked the Étoile du Sud hotel which, according to Agence France-Presse, was occupied by numerous expatriates at the time. According to officials, 15 civilians and three special forces soldiers were killed.

The attackers were described as African, armed with Kalashnikov rifles and grenade belts and dressed in casual clothes and balaclavas. A shootout occurred between the attackers and police as the assailants reached the La Paillote Hotel. Local residents and tourists were evacuated by army personnel from the beach to nearby hotels, which were temporarily placed on lockdown.

The Associated Press quoted Government officials as saying that security forces had killed six armed men. The terrorists allegedly shouted "Allahu Akbar". An American embassy delegation was at Grand-Bassam on the date of the attack, but the US Embassy in Abidjan said on Twitter that there is "no evidence that U.S. citizens were targeted nor confirmed reports of any  citizens as harmed." French authorities had warned both Ivory Coast and Senegal weeks earlier of the danger of a terrorist attack. 

Al-Qaeda in the Islamic Maghreb (AQIM) and al-Mourabitoun claimed responsibility for the attack. On 17 March, AQIM released the names of the attackers: Hamza al-Fulani and Abu Adam al-Ansari from al-Mourabitoun and Abderrahmane al-Fulani from the "Emirate of the Desert". It had been the third bloody attack on a tourism resort in West Africa for four months. In all, dozens of people fell victim to the assassinations and more were injured.

Casualties

Reactions

Domestic 
 President Alassane Ouattara, visiting the site, stated: "These cowardly attacks by terrorists will not be tolerated".

International reactions
 : Global Affairs Canada stated that "Canada condemns the terrorist attack at Grand-Bassam beach resort in Côte d'Ivoire. Our thoughts and prayers are with you."
: President François Hollande stated that he "strongly condemns the cowardly attack that caused the death of at least ten civilians, including at least one French national, and several members of the security forces in Grand-Bassam". He also stated that "France will bring its logistical support and intelligence to Ivory Coast to find the attackers. It will pursue and intensify its cooperation with its partners in the fight against terrorism."
: Prime Minister Narendra Modi condemned the attacks and stated his thoughts were with the families of the victims and wished the injured a speedy recovery.
: Prime Minister David Cameron stated on Twitter: "I'm appalled by the devastating terror attacks in Ankara and the Ivory Coast. My thoughts are with all those affected."
: In a statement by the National Security Council of the White House, the U.S. condemned the terrorist attack in Grand-Bassam. Furthermore, it extended deep condolences to the loved ones of the victims and that their thoughts and prayers also are with the injured. It also commended "the bravery of the Ivorian and French security personnel who responded to the situation and prevented even worse loss of life."

See also

2015 Bamako hotel attack
2015 Sousse attacks
2016 Ouagadougou attacks
Crime in Ivory Coast
June 2016 Mogadishu attacks
List of Islamist terrorist attacks
List of terrorist incidents, January–June 2016

Notes

References

2016 crimes in Ivory Coast
2016 murders in Africa
2016 mass shootings in Africa
2010s murders in Ivory Coast
Attacks on buildings and structures in 2016
Attacks on hotels in Africa
Attacks on tourists
Islamic terrorist incidents in 2016
March 2016 crimes in Africa
March 2016 events in Africa
Mass murder in 2016
Mass murder in Africa
Sud-Comoé
Terrorist incidents attributed to al-Qaeda in the Islamic Maghreb
Terrorist incidents in Ivory Coast in 2016
Islamic terrorism in Ivory Coast